Chalicotheriines are one of the two subfamilies of the extinct family Chalicotheriidae, a group of herbivorous, odd-toed ungulate (perissodactyl) mammals that lived from the Eocene to the Pleistocene. The other subfamily is the Schizotheriinae. Chalcotheriines evolved unique characteristics for ungulates, with very long forelimbs, short hindlimbs, and a relatively gorilla-like physique, including knuckle-walking on their flexible forelimbs, which bore long curved claws. Members of this subfamily possessed some of the longest forelimbs and shortest hindlimbs in relation to each other out of all extinct animals. Analysis of dental wear implies that most chalicotheriines fed on seeds and fruit. Their claws were likely used in a hook-like manner to pull down branches, suggesting they lived as bipedal browsers.

Presence of chalicothere fossils is generally regarded as an indicator of forested environments. Unlike schizotheriines, chalicotheriines were typically confined to moist forests with a full tree canopy, and their lower-crowned teeth indicate a softer diet. While their appearance may look odd for an ungulate with a horse-like head, similar forms have evolved repeatedly in unrelated lineages: large herbivores that feed as bipedal browsers, standing or sitting upright and pulling down branches or stripping vegetation with clawed forelimbs. Examples include therizinosaurs, the pantodont Barylambda, homalodotheres, and megatheriid ground sloths. Anisodon shows ischial callosities on the pelvis, a characteristic adaptation for sitting for long periods of time. Chalicotheriines are likely to have diverged as specialist feeders sitting in lush forests, similar to modern gorillas and giant pandas.

See also
Moropus
Schizotheriinae

References

 
Pleistocene extinctions
Miocene first appearances
Fossil taxa described in 1914